The men's slalom competition in water skiing at the 2017 World Games took place from 25 to 26 July 2017 at the Old Odra River in Wrocław, Poland.

Competition format
A total of 11 athletes entered the competition. From qualifications the best 9 skiers qualify to final. Skiers have to pass 6 buoys. Every time length of the rope is shorter, respectively: 18.25m, 13.00m, 12.00m, 11.25m, 10.75m and 10.25m. The score include number of good passes of buoys, speed (58 km/h for every athlete) and length of the rope.

Results

Qualifications

Final

References 

 
2017 World Games